The 1973 Milwaukee Brewers season involved the Brewers' finishing fifth in the American League East with a record of 74 wins and 88 losses.

Offseason 
 October 31, 1972: Jim Lonborg, Ken Brett, Ken Sanders, and Earl Stephenson were traded by the Brewers to the Philadelphia Phillies for Don Money, John Vukovich, and Bill Champion.
 November 15, 1972: Joe Azcue was released by the Brewers.

Regular season

Season standings

Record vs. opponents

Notable transactions 
 June 5, 1973: Robin Yount was drafted by the Brewers in the 1st round (3rd pick) of the 1973 Major League Baseball draft.

Roster

Player stats

Batting

Starters by position 
Note: Pos = Position; G = Games played; AB = At bats; H = Hits; Avg. = Batting average; HR = Home runs; RBI = Runs batted in

Other batters 
Note: G = Games played; AB = At bats; H = Hits; Avg. = Batting average; HR = Home runs; RBI = Runs batted in

Pitching

Starting pitchers 
Note: G = Games pitched; IP = Innings pitched; W = Wins; L = Losses; ERA = Earned run average; SO = Strikeouts

Other pitchers 
Note: G = Games pitched; IP = Innings pitched; W = Wins; L = Losses; ERA = Earned run average; SO = Strikeouts

Relief pitchers 
Note: G = Games pitched; W = Wins; L = Losses; SV = Saves; ERA = Earned run average; SO = Strikeouts

Farm system

The Brewers' farm system consisted of four minor league affiliates in 1973.

Notes

References 
1973 Milwaukee Brewers at Baseball Reference
1973 Milwaukee Brewers at Baseball Almanac

Milwaukee Brewers seasons
Milwaukee Brewers season
Milwaukee Brewers